Butterfly Effect is the debut solo studio album by American singer Ashley Roberts. It was released through Metropolis London on September 1, 2014. There are two singles released from the album: "Clockwork", on May 25, and "Woman Up" on August 25. It was produced by eight producers including Frankmusik.

Background
In 2003, Roberts joined girl group The Pussycat Dolls. They released many hits through the years, like: "Don't Cha", "Buttons", "When I Grow Up" and "I Hate This Part". Seven years later, in 2010, the group broke up and Roberts released her debut single "A Summer Place".

In 2012, she released two singles: promotional song "Yesterday" in November, and a song for digital download for debut album, entitled "All in a Day". In late 2013, Roberts met eight new producers for her debut album. One of the producers was Red Triangle. The album was finished in June 2014 and there were ten songs that Roberts chose for the album. There are two singles from the album: "Clockwork" which released on May 25, 2014, and "Woman Up" which released August 25, 2014.

Track listing

Chart performance

Release history

References

2014 debut albums